Dactylonia is a genus of shrimp in the family Palaemonidae, first described by Charles Fransen in 2002. 

WoRMS accepts the following species:

Dactylonia anachoreta 
 Dactylonia ascidicola 
Dactylonia borradalei 
Dactylonia carinicula 
Dactylonia franseni 
Dactylonia holthuisi 
Dactylonia monnioti 
Dactylonia okai

References

Palaemonoidea
Crustaceans described in 2002
Taxa named by Charles Fransen